Raymond 'Ray' Philyaw (born July 30, 1974) is a former arena football quarterback who was most recently the offensive coordinator of the Jacksonville Sharks of the Arena Football League (AFL). He also played for the Cleveland Gladiators, Chicago Rush, Kansas City Brigade, Bossier-Shreveport Battle Wings and the Albany/Indiana Firebirds, leading the former to the American Conference championship game in 2004 and 2005. Prior to his Arena Football career, he played for the Winnipeg Blue Bombers of the Canadian Football League and the Madison Mad Dogs of the Indoor Football League. After leaving to coach with the New Orleans VooDoo in 2011, he attempted a return as a player in 2012 with the San Jose SaberCats, but later became OC for the San Antonio Talons. He holds the record for the highest career TD-to-INT ratio in AFL history and threw a school record 52 TDs while attending Northeast Louisiana.

Early life
Philyaw attended Southwood High School in Caddo Parish, Louisiana. While there, he participated in football, basketball and track & field, winning a district championship his senior year in both football and basketball.

College career
Philyaw attended Northeast Louisiana University, where he continued his football career. Philyaw started his sophomore through senior seasons for the Indians. At the completion of his career in 1996, Philyaw's 52 career touchdown passes stood as a school record until Steven Jyles broke his record in 2005. In 2009, Philyaw was inducted into the ULM Athletics Hall of Fame.

Statistics
Philyaw's college stats at the completion of the 1996 season. Source:

Professional career

Winnipeg Blue Bombers

Madison Mad Dogs

Shreveport Knights
Philyaw was backup quarterback for the Shreveport Knights of the short-lived Regional Football League in 1999.

Albany/Indiana Firebirds

Chicago Rush
With the Chicago Rush in 2004, Philyaw lead the Rush to the conference semi-finals, but when he suffered an ACL injury, the Rush lost momentum and fell to the San Jose SaberCats.

Kansas City Brigade
In 2006, Philyaw signed with expansion Kansas City Brigade, after the Brigade released veteran Andy Kelly.

Cleveland Gladiators
In 2008, Philyaw lead the Cleveland Gladiators to the National Conference finals. The Gladiators lost the game 35–70 to the champion Philadelphia Soul.

Bossier-Shreveport Battle Wings

San Jose SaberCats
In 2012, Philyaw attempted a comeback with the San Jose SaberCats, but never made the roster.

Coaching career

New Orleans VooDoo
In 2011, Philyaw was hired by the New Orleans VooDoo as the team's offensive coordinator.

San Antonio Talons
In 2013, Philyaw as hired as the San Antonio Talons' offensive coordinator. Philyaw dealt with injuries during the year, starting five different quarterbacks in the first seven weeks of the season. The Talons did not find an ownership group for the 2015 season, and the franchise was placed on suspension, leaving Philyaw jobless.

References

External links
 AFL stats

1974 births
Living people
Players of American football from Shreveport, Louisiana
American football quarterbacks
Louisiana–Monroe Warhawks football players
Regional Football League players
Chicago Rush players
Albany Firebirds players
Indiana Firebirds players
Kansas City Brigade players
Cleveland Gladiators players
San Jose SaberCats players
Bossier–Shreveport Battle Wings players
Jacksonville Sharks coaches
San Antonio Talons coaches
New Orleans VooDoo coaches